Thomas Norman Ault (December 17, 1880 – February 6, 1950) was a book illustrator and writer, now best known as a compiler of anthologies.

He wrote children's literature with his wife (He)Lena, who died in 1904. He later was noted as a scholar of English poetry of the seventeenth century, and Alexander Pope.

Works
The Rhyme Book (1906) with Lena Ault
The Podgy Book of Tales with Lena Ault
Dreamland Shores (1920)  
Life In Ancient Britain 1920
The Poet's Life Of Christ (1923) editor
Elizabethan Lyrics: From The Original Texts (1925) anthology
Seventeenth Century Lyrics: From The Original Texts (1928) anthology
Pope's Own Miscellany (Nonesuch Press, 1935)
The Prose Works of Alexander Pope: The Earlier Works, 1711-1720 (1936)
A Treasury of Unfamiliar Lyrics (1938) anthology
A New Light on Pope (1949) 
Alexander Pope Minor Poems (1954) editor, completed by John Butt

Bibliography
 The Imaginative Book Illustration Society at  has a bibliography by Robin Greer in Studies in Illustration no.2 1996

References

External links
 

1880 births
1950 deaths
British children's writers
British illustrators